Tasnova Tamanna is a Bangladeshi actress. She won Bangladesh National Film Award for Best Actress for her role in the film Nonajoler Kabbo (2021).

References

External links

Living people
Bangladeshi film actresses
Best Actress National Film Awards (Bangladesh) winners
Place of birth missing (living people)
Date of birth missing (living people)
Year of birth missing (living people)